William Dunbar (c. 1460 – c. 1520) was a Scottish poet.

William Dunbar may also refer to:
Sir William Dunbar, 7th Baronet (1812–1889), Scottish Liberal Member of Parliament in the British House of Commons
William Dunbar (Code Lyoko), a character in the animated television series Code Lyoko
William Dunbar (explorer) (1750–1810), Scottish and American naturalist, astronomer, explorer
William Dunbar (politician) (1805–1861), U.S. Representative from Louisiana
William Dunbar (songwriter) (1852/53–1874), prolific Gateshead songwriter
William C. Dunbar (1822–1905), Scottish Mormon missionary and Mormon pioneer
William P. Dunbar (1863–1922), American physician who made seminal discoveries about cholera control
William Dunbar (bishop) (1661–1746),Scottish Episcopal clergyman
William F. Dunbar (1820–?), American politician

See also
William Dunbar Holder (1824–1900), Confederate politician
William Dunbar House, Boise, Idaho, NRHP listing